"Inside Out" is a song recorded by German Eurodance band Culture Beat, released in November 1995 as the first single from their third studio album, Inside Out (1995). As for other Culture Beat singles, a CD maxi entirely composed of remixes was added among the available media a short time after. The song was a hit in most of the European countries where it was released, and peaked at number five in Germany, its highest position in the various charts. Outside Europe, it peaked at number two on the RPM dance music chart in Canada and number 15 on the Billboard Hot Dance Club Play chart in the US.

Critical reception
Larry Flick from Billboard wrote, "Culture Beat, one of the more enduring acts from rave/NRG, returns with "Inside Out", a jumpy li'l ditty on 550 Music. The techno flavor of the act's past recordings remains mildly intact, though the arrangements lean more toward soft keyboards and a fluffy disco context. Perfect for tea dances and other jolly gatherings." Pan-European magazine Music & Media commented, "Chill out with the original Eurodance stars. A cuddly track chugging along at moderate speed combines with a sonorous male rap that makes it a sure EHR hit." They added, "Dance freaks and club DJ's can delight in no less than 11 remixes. Still, it's the Not Loveland Master Radio Edit 1 which is most suitable for radio. The spooky male voice half way through this otherwise happy uptempo beat adds an unusual touch." James Hamilton from Music Weeks RM Dance Update described the song as a "bland slick Euro throbber". 

Chart performance
"Inside Out" was a major hit on the charts on several continents. In Europe, it peaked within the top 10 in Austria, Denmark, Germany and Hungary. Additionally, it was a top 20 hit in Belgium, Finland and Switzerland, as well as on the Eurochart Hot 100, where it peaked at number 17. It charted on the UK Singles Chart in the UK, peaking at number 32 in its first week at the chart, on January 21, 1996. But on the UK Dance Chart, it was more successful, reaching number 14. Outside Europe, it hit number two on the RPM Dance/Urban chart in Canada, number five in Israel, number 15 on the Billboard Hot Dance Club Play chart in the US, number 44 in New Zealand and number 62 in Australia. It was awarded with a gold record in Germany, with a sale of 150,000 singles.

Music video
The accompanying music video for "Inside Out" was directed by Friedel & Chrudimak.

Track listings

 CD maxi-single (Europe, 1995) "Inside Out" (Radio Edit) - 3:55
 "Inside Out" (Extended Version) - 5:56
 "Inside Out" (Doug Laurent Mix) - 5:48
 "Inside Out" (Temple Of Light Mix) - 6:50
 "Inside Out" (Mikado Mix) - 6:19
 "Inside Out" (Transformed Brainstorm Mix) - 7:57
 "Inside Out" (Not Normal Mix) - 2:29

 CD maxi-single - Remix (Europe, 1995) "Inside Out" (Not Loveland Master Radio Edit 1) - 3:36
 "Inside Out" (DNS Radio Mix) - 3:50
 "Inside Out" (Doug Laurent Euro Mix) - 6:16
 "Inside Out" (Felix Gauder Mix) - 6:28
 "Inside Out" (DNS Mix) - 5:01
 "Inside Out" (Private Area Mix) - 7:39
 "Inside Out" (Andrew Brix Good Vibes Mix) - 7:52
 "Inside Out" (DJ Tom & Norman Mix) - 7:22
 "Inside Out" (Kai McDonald Eternia Mix) - 9:48
 "Inside Out" (Quadriga Mix) - 6:19
 "Inside Out" (Not Loveland Master Mix 12") - 8:58

 CD maxi-single - promo (USA, 1996) "Inside Out" (Radio Mix) - 3:55
 "Inside Out" (No Rap Mix) - 3:26
 "Inside Out" (Not Normal U.S. (Only Tania) Mix) - 2:54

 Vinyl 12" - promo (USA, 1996)'
 "Inside Out" (Extended Version) - 5:56
 "Inside Out" (Extended Rapless Version) - 6:04
 "Inside Out" (DNS Mix) - 5:02
 "Inside Out" (Not Loveland Master Mix 12") - 8:58
 "Inside Out" (Transformed Brainstorm Mix) - 7:57
 "Inside Out" (Not Loveland Master "Shake Ya Dub" Mix) - 7:59
 "Inside Out" (Private Area Mix) - 7:42
 "Inside Out" (Temple Of Light Mix) - 6:50
 "Inside Out" (DJ Tom & Norman Mix) - 7:21
 "Inside Out" (Not Normal Mix) - 2:29

Charts and sales

Weekly charts

Year-end charts

Certifications

References

1995 singles
Culture Beat songs
Songs written by Jay Supreme
Songs written by Nosie Katzmann
Dance Pool singles
1995 songs